The 1992 Hamilton Tiger-Cats season was the 35th season for the team in the Canadian Football League and their 43rd overall. The Tiger-Cats finished in 2nd place in the East Division with an 11–7 record. After defeating the Ottawa Rough Riders in the East Semi-Final, the team appeared in the East Final, but lost to the Winnipeg Blue Bombers.

Offseason

CFL Draft

Preseason

Regular season

Season standings

Schedule

Postseason

Awards and honours

1992 CFL All-Stars

References

Hamilton Tiger-Cats seasons
Ham